Qiaoyi is a town in  Wangcheng district, Changsha, Hunan, China. the town is bordered by Chuanshanping town of Miluo and Chating to the north, Beishan town of Changsha county to the east, Shaping and Qingzhuhu subdistricts of Kaifu district to the south, Tongguan Subdistrict to the west.

Subdivision
On March 23, 2016, the village-level divisions of Qiaoyi were adjusted from 17 to 9, 
There eight villages and one 
residential community.

References

Township-level divisions of Wangcheng
Wangcheng